Swiss tennis player Roger Federer's main accomplishments as a junior player came at Wimbledon, where, in 1998, he won both the singles tournament over Irakli Labadze, in straight sets, and the doubles with Olivier Rochus, over the team of Michaël Llodra and Andy Ram, also in straight sets. In addition, Federer was a runner-up at the US Open Junior tournament in 1998, losing the final to David Nalbandian. Federer would go on to win four other junior singles tournaments in his career.

As a junior, Federer was also known as a "hot head" on court which is distinct from his adult image of cool and calm, and being a great on-court role model.

Junior career 1993-1998

Federer was almost four years old when Boris Becker, his childhood idol, won his first Wimbledon title in 1985. From then on, Federer watched "tennis matches on television for hours on end." Reflecting on his childhood, he said, "I liked tennis the best of all sports. It was always exciting and winning or losing was always in my hands." Soon after enrolling in school at the age of six, Federer became the best in his age group and trained three times a week in and around Basel. It was at these sessions that he became friends with Marco Chiudinelli, a "talented" boy a month younger than Federer. The boys often played squash, table tennis, and soccer together. A region-wide top tennis group was formed when the pair was eight years old; despite playing for different clubs, they became members.

They first played each other at an official event called The Bambino Cup in Arlesheim when both were eight. "Back then we only played one long set of up to nine games," Chiudinelli recollects. "Things weren't going well for me at the beginning. I was behind 2–5 and I started to cry. We cried a lot back then even during the matches. Roger came up to me and tried to comfort me when we switched sides. He told me everything would be alright, and in fact, things got better. I took the lead 7–6 and noticed that the tide had turned. Then he began to cry and I ran up to him and give him encouragement and things went better for him. It was the only time I could beat him."

When he was 10, Federer began weekly private coaching with Adolf Kacovsky, a tennis coach at The Old Boys Tennis Club. "I noticed right away that this guy was a natural talent," said Kacovsky. "He was born with a racquet in his hand." At first, Federer received lessons only while part of a group, although "the club and I quickly noticed he was enormously talented. We began giving him private lessons that were partly funded by the club. Roger was a quick learner. When you wanted to teach him something new, he was able to pick it up after three or four tries, while others in the group needed weeks."

A "star pupil", the Swiss youngster always wanted to become the best in the world. "People laughed at him, including me," recollects Kacovsky. "I thought that he would perhaps become the best player in Switzerland or Europe but not the best in the world. He had it in his head and he worked at it."

He played soccer until the age of twelve, when he decided to focus solely on tennis. At fourteen, he became the national champion of all groups in Switzerland and was chosen to train at the Swiss National Tennis Center in Écublens. He joined the ITF junior tennis circuit in July 1996. In 1998, his final year as a junior, Federer won the junior Wimbledon title and was recognized as the ITF World Junior Tennis champion of the year. He also won the under 18s category at the prestigious Orange Bowl.

ITF Junior Circuit finals

Singles: 6 (5 titles, 1 runner-up)

Doubles: 4 (2 titles, 2 runner-ups)

All matches

See also
Roger Federer
Roger Federer career statistics

References

External links
 
Federer ITF Juniors

1995-1998
Junior tennis
1996 in tennis
1997 in tennis
1998 in tennis
1990s in Swiss tennis
1990s in Swiss sport